Caloon (also coolan or cooloon) may refer to certain species of Australian trees within the genus Elaeocarpus including:

Elaeocarpus angustifolius
Elaeocarpus coorangooloo
Elaeocarpus ruminatus